Cape Ducorps is a point marking the north end of Cockerell Peninsula on the north coast of Trinity Peninsula. It was discovered by the French Antarctic Expedition, 1837–40, under Captain Jules Dumont d'Urville, and named by him for Louis Ducorps, a member of the expedition.

See also 
 Peralta Rocks, lying 7 nautical miles (13 km) north of Cape Ducorps

References

External links

Headlands of Trinity Peninsula